Feludar Goyendagiri is an Indian streaming television series, directed by Srijit Mukherji. It is based on the stories of the Bengali sleuth Feluda, written by Satyajit Ray. Originally known as Feluda Pherot and streaming on Addatimes, the show was began streaming on Hoichoi from 17 June 2022.

Cast 

 Tota Roy Chowdhury as Prodosh Chandra Mitra or Feluda
 Kalpan Mitra as Topesh Ranjan Mitra or Topshe
 Anirban Chakraborty as Lalmohan Ganguly or Jatayu

Chhinnamastar Abhishap (Addatimes)

 Dhritiman Chatterjee as Mahesh Chowdhury
 Arindam Ganguly as Arunendra Chowdhury 
 Samadarshi Dutta as Pritindra Chowdhury 
 Poulomi Das as Neelima Debi
 Krishnendu Deowanoji as Shankarlal
 Rishi Kaushik as Biren Karandikar
 Adrija Dutta as Bibi

Jawto Kando Kathmandute (Addatimes)
 Kharaj Mukherjee as Maganlal Meghraj
 Bharat Kaul as Anantalal Batra

Darjeeling Jawmjawmat (Hoichoi)
 Barun Chanda as Birupakkho Majumdar
 Suprobhat Das as Samiran Majumdar
 Loknath Dey as Inspector Jotish Saha
 Saheb Bhattacharya as Rajen Raina or V. Balaporiya
 Rahul Banerjee as Pulak Ghoshal 
 Subrat Dutta as Mahadev Verma
 Munmun Roy as Suchandra
 Indrasish Roy as Young Birupakkho Majumdar (Guest Appearance)
 Mainak Banerjee as Rajat Bose or Ramen Brahmo
 Phalguni Chatterjee as Harinarayan Mukherjee
 Subhankar Ghatak as Loknath Beyara

Feluda Pherot

Mukherji's playwright days
In April 2008, during his playwright times, Mukherji formed his own troupe, Pandora's Act, whose first production, Feluda Pherot! at Rangashankara in July 2008 was a runaway success. It was the first ever non-canonical dramatisation of Satyajit Ray's sleuth Feluda. Barun Chanda, Ray's leading man in Seemabodhho, and Parambrata Chatterjee, the screen Topshe and film youth icon, starred in this production. Chanda was later cast in a supporting role in the 1st season of Feludar Goyendagiri.

Addatimes series
In 2020, during the trailer launch event of the web series Feluda Pherot, Rajiv Mehra, the founder of Addatimes, said that, after bringing Parambrata Chatterjee's modern day adaptation of Feluda from Bioscope to Addatimes, he was skeptical about people's acceptance of the new avatar. While discussing the project of doing a new Feluda series, Srijit Mukherji showed his interest in directing it.

The first season, based on the story Chinnamastar Abhishap, was released on Christmas 2020. The trailer of the second season, Jawto Kando Kathmandute, was released simultaneously with the first season trailer and was also announced to arrive on Christmas 2020 but was later postponed to Christmas 2021 and then, was postponed indefinitely.

Moved to Hoichoi
In the Hoichoi season 5 catalogue, the platform hinted at bringing the series on their platform. The formal announcement was made on 15 April 2022, in their new content catalogue. A special promo was released on 1 May 2022, celebrating Ray's birth anniversary.

Marketing and Release 
The series was announced as part of Hoichoi's new content catalogue on 15 April 2022, on the occasion of Bengali New Year. A promo was launched on 1 May 2022, coinciding with Satyajit Ray's birthday.

The official trailer was launched on 1 June 2022. The series is set to stream from 17 June onwards.

Season 1

Production
The shooting of the first season began in Darjeeling in March 2022 and was finished within 16 days. The series is based on Darjeeling Jawmjawmat.

Episodes

Music 
The music and background score is composed by Joy Sarkar.

The title song for Feluda Pherot, which is a recreation of Satyajit Ray's legendary theme for Feluda, is sung by Rupam Islam, Rupankar Bagchi and Anupam Roy.

The title song for Feludar Goyendagiri, which is also a recreation of Satyajit Ray's legendary theme for Feluda, is sung by Sidhu, Shilajit and Anindya Chattopadhyay.

References 

Feluda (series)
Hoichoi original programming